This is the discography of Taiwanese Mandopop quartet boy band Fahrenheit who has been active in Asia since 2005. The group consists of four members: Jiro Wang, Wu Chun, Calvin Chen, and Aaron Yan. Their music is distributed by HIM International Music in Taiwan, by WOW Music in Hong Kong and by Pony Canyon in Japan. Fahrenheit are often associated with their seniors, S.H.E, who are also under HIM International Music.

Studio albums

Extended plays

Singles

Concert DVD

Soundtrack contributions

Other songs

Others
 More Beautiful World 《比較美好的世界》 (Sichuan Earthquake) HIM All Star (Power Station 動力火車, S.H.E, Tank, Fahrenheit 飛輪海 （Calvin Chen 辰亦儒, Jiro Wang 汪東城, Aaron Yan 炎亞綸）, Yoga Lin 林宥嘉, Jeno Liu 劉力揚, One Million Star 星光幫) - 2008
 《Gatsby I like it》 （Gatsby CF Theme Song） - 2008
 Happy Beat 123 《歡樂節拍123》 （Shanghai World Expo refueling song theme song）
 Pebbles and delicious gift to double 《畅爽加倍 更添美味》(Coca-Cola Theme Song CF) - 2009
 《The Heart Of Asia》 (Bureau of Tourism Travel Fair in Seoul latest work Fahrenheit Taiwan landscape)
 Jiro Wang汪東城 For me 《替我》 （Purple House Movie Theme Song 紫宅電影主題曲） - 2011

Collaborations

Notes

References

External links
  Fahrenciti.com - official Taiwan homepage
  Fahrenheit@HIM Taiwan

Discographies of Taiwanese artists
Mandopop discographies
Pop music group discographies